The 3246th Test Wing was a flight test component of the Air Proving Ground Center, later Armament Division, at Eglin Air Force Base, Florida, and was activated 1 July 1970 to provide weapon and countermeasures test duties. It was replaced by the 46th Test Wing in October 1992.

This unit is notable for operating the last active-duty USAF F-4D Phantom II (66-8800), relegated to the Eglin target range in July 1992.  It carried the logo "Phantoms Phorever 1963–1992". 66-8800 has been sitting on the ramp at Pierce Field (Eglin Auxiliary Field #2) since retirement. It is there in 2012.

History
Assigned to the 3246th Test Wing was the 3247th Test Squadron, which inherited F-4C/D/E and RF-4C Phantom II aircraft formerly assigned to the Air Proving Ground Center's 4533d Test Wing. The 3247th aircraft carried AD and ET tail codes, and a white tailband with red diamonds.

Components
 6585th Test Group, 1 January 1984 – 1 October 1992
 3247th Test Squadron, 1 July 1970 – 1 October 1992 (inactivated and consolidated with 40th Tactical Fighter Squadron)

Stations
 Eglin Air Force Base, Florida, 1 July 1970 – 1 October 1992

Aircraft
 A-10A Thunderbolt II
 YA-10B Thunderbolt II
 C-131B Samaritan
 C-130 Hercules
 F-4 Phantom II
 RF-4C Phantom II
 F-15 Eagle
 F-15E Strike Eagle
 F-16 Fighting Falcon
 F-100D Super Sabre
 General Dynamics F-111A
 General Dynamics F-111E
 T-38 Talon
 CT-39A Sabreliner
 HH-1H, UH-1N Huey
 UH-60 Black Hawk

References 

 Martin, Patrick. Tail Code: The Complete History of USAF Tactical Aircraft Tail Code Markings. Schiffer Military Aviation History, 1994. . Image source listed as United States Air Force

Military units and formations established in 1970